Ecdemus carmania is a moth of the subfamily Arctiinae first described by Herbert Druce in 1883. It is found in Ecuador.

References

Moths described in 1883
Arctiinae